Lincoln was a parliamentary electorate in the Canterbury region of New Zealand from 1881 to 1890. It was represented by two Members of Parliament.

Population centres
The previous electoral redistribution was undertaken in 1875 for the 1875–1876 election. In the six years since, New Zealand's European population had increased by 65%. In the 1881 electoral redistribution, the House of Representatives increased the number of European representatives to 91 (up from 84 since the 1875–76 election). The number of Māori electorates was held at four. The House further decided that electorates should not have more than one representative, which led to 35 new electorates being formed, including Lincoln, and two electorates that had previously been abolished to be recreated. This necessitated a major disruption to existing boundaries.

The  had polling booths in Lincoln, Springston, Yaldhurst, West Melton, Cass, Prebbleton, Springfield, Sheffield, Halkett, Kirwee and Darfield.

History

Arthur O'Callaghan and Henry William Peryman contested the Lincoln electorate in the 1881 election. O'Callaghan, who supported the opposition, beat Peryman by 277 to 154.

The incumbent narrowly won the election with 266 to 263 votes.

Saunders strongly criticised O'Callaghan, who as a government supporter had his share of responsibility of the recession, according to Saunders' claim. Saunders won the show of hands at that meeting, with Enys coming second. Again, O'Callaghan held a narrow majority over Saunders, with 654 over 643 votes. Enys received 127 votes.

O'Callaghan was taken to the Christchurch Magistrate's Court over unpaid wages towards the end of 1888. He became insolvent and resigned from Parliament on 9 November 1888. John Ollivier, best known for his activities on the Canterbury Provincial Council and last represented in Parliament in 1860, announced his candidacy on the day of O'Callaghan's resignation. At the nomination meeting on 9 January 1889, Ollivier and Saunders were put forward, with the latter winning the show of hands. The  was held on 16 January and was won by Saunders with 676 votes to 332.

The electorate was abolished at the end of the 10th Parliament in 1890.

Election results
The electorate was represented by two Members of Parliament:

Key

Election results

1889 by-election

1881 election

Notes

References

Historical electorates of New Zealand
1881 establishments in New Zealand
1890 disestablishments in New Zealand